Race results from the automobile and motorcycle races contested at the Brands Hatch circuit in Fawkham, Kent.

Formula One World Championship

Formula One Non-World Championship races

†  International Formula car
†† Formula 5000 car

A1 Grand Prix of Nations, Great Britain

Indycars

European Formula 5000 Championship
The BRSCC's F5000 championship, organised in the UK but taking in events across Europe, started in 1969. The title sponsorship moved from Guards to Rothmans to Shellsport before the series let in Formula One, Formula Two and Formula Atlantic cars for 1976.

International Formula Two Championship

International Formula 3000

Formula 3000 International Masters

British Formula 3000/Formula Two Championship

European Formula Three

British Formula Three

World Sportscar Championship

BPR Global GT Series

European Touring Car Championship

World Touring Car Championship

British Touring Car Championship

 The first race of the 1958 season was actually held 26 December 1957
+ 1 hour Endurance Race

Deutsche Tourenwagen Masters

Superbike World Championship

British Superbike Championship

+ The original meeting was cancelled due to heavy snow

British Rallycross Grand Prix

+ Fastest over one lap only, due to fog.
 also a round of the European Rallycross Championship

References

Motorsport venues in England
Race results at motorsport venues